The Citrate-Mg2+:H+ (CitM) / Citrate-Ca2+:H+ (CitH) Symporter (CitMHS) Family (TC# 2.A.11) is a family of transport proteins belonging to the Ion transporter superfamily. Members of this family are found in Gram-positive and Gram-negative bacteria, archaea and possibly eukaryotes. These proteins all probably arose by an internal gene duplication event. Lensbouer & Doyle (2010) have reviewed these systems, classifying the porters with three superfamilies, according to ion-preference:

1) Mg2+-preferring,

2) Ca2+-preferring, and

3) Fe2+-preferring.

A representative list of proteins belonging to the CitMHS family can be found in the Transporter Classification Database.

CitM and CitH 
Two of the characterized members of the CitMHS family, both citrate uptake permeases from Bacillus subtilis, are CitM (TC# 2.A.11.1.1) and CitH (TC# 2.A.11.1.2).

Function 
CitM is believed to transport a citrate2−-Mg2+complex in symport with one H+ per Mg2+-citrate while CitH apparently transports a citrate2−-Ca2+ complex in symport with protons. The cation specificity of CitM is: Mg2+, Mn2+, Ba2+, Ni2+, Co2+, Ca2+ and Zn2+, in this preferential order. CitM is highly specific for citrate and D-isocitrate and does not transport other di- and tri-carboxylates including succinate, L-isocitrate, cis-aconitate and tricarballylate. For CitH, the cation specificity (in order of preference) is: Ca2+, Ba2+ and Sr2+. The two proteins are 60% identical, contain about 400 amino acyl residues and possess twelve putative transmembrane spanners. A CitM homologue in S. mutans transports citrate conjugated to Fe2+ or Mn2+ but not Ca2+, Mg2+ or Ni2+.

The transport reactions catalyzed by (1) CitM and (2) CitH, respectively, are:

(1) Citrate • Mg (out) + nH+ (out) ⇌ Citrate • Mg (in) + nH+ (in)

(2) Citrate (out) + nH+ (out) ⇌ Citrate (in) + nH+ (in)

(3) Citrate • Ca2+ (out) + nH+ (out) ⇌ Citrate • Ca2+ (in) + nH+ (in)

See also 
 Membrane transport protein
 Carrier protein
 Calcium in biology
 Transporter Classification Database

References 

Protein families
Membrane proteins
Transmembrane proteins
Transmembrane transporters
Transport proteins
Integral membrane proteins